Lane End is a village and civil parish in Buckinghamshire, England. The village is twinned with Saint-Pierre-d'Oléron in France.

The civil parish includes the hamlets of Cadmore End, Ditchfield, Moor Common and Moor End, and had a population of 3,583 at the 2001 Census.

History
Lane End was historically on the borders of the parishes of Great Marlow, Hambleden, Fingest and West Wycombe, with a small part (Ackhampstead) belonging to the parish of Lewknor in Oxfordshire until 1895.  In 1867 the ecclesiastical parish of Lane End was formed from the neighbouring parishes.  The village continued to be divided between the four neighbouring civil parishes until 1934, when the parts within Great Marlow, Hambleden and West Wycombe civil parishes were transferred to Fingest (renamed Fingest and Lane End in 1937).  In the 1980s the parish of Fingest and Lane End was abolished, and the civil parish of Lane End was formed.

In addition to working the land to provide wheat and barley to the breweries in Marlow and Henley, the inhabitants traditionally manufactured chairs or worked in a local iron foundry.

During the Second World War, King Zog of Albania lived at Parmoor House in Frieth, a hamlet a mile south of Lane End, and with many Albanians living in Lane End, used to attend village events.

According to local legend, the village is haunted by the ghost of a girl in a red dress, who died two weeks before her wedding day in 1766.

Schools 
The main school in Lane End is Lane End Primary School which is located inside the village, on 2 Edmonds Rd, Lane End, High Wycombe HP14 3EJ. Lane end is situated on three acres of land and features two playgrounds, a field and multiple grassy spaces. Lane End Primary school has a total pupil capacity of 210, and teaches an age range of 2-11 year olds. the school is defined as a mixed, community school and has an Ofsted rating of Good.

Lane End's facilites include a nursery, which looks after children from the ages of 2-4; 7 classrooms which are equipped for teaching students throughout the years; a refurbished learning cafe, which was opened on 15 May 2017; and multiple natural areas, such as a field, medow, multiple trees, a pond and outdoor seating availability. As well as this, Lane End Community Centre is situated on the school grounds.

The current Headteacher is Mrs D Williams. the school is said to "Work closely with the community of Lane End and beyond, and aim to ensure each and every child at our school is able to grow to be the very best version of themselves, both academically and socially."

Lane End primary school has been Featured in the bucks free press on numerous occasions, one for the daily dances in the school, started by the current headteacher, Mrs Williams; and another for winning a £15,000 grant from the Department of Education.

Churches
The oldest church in the village is the Methodist church which started as a congregational church, meeting in a chapel in Marlow Road in 1801.  Later this was replaced by a chapel, built in 1835, which is now Lane End Studios.  A Wesleyan chapel was built in 1866, but the congregation now meets at the Parish Church at 11:15 on Sunday mornings

The parish is served by the church of the Holy Trinity in Ditchfield Common, which was built in 1832.  (see www.laneendholytrinity.org.uk) It is part of a team ministry of 4 churches - Lane End, Stokenchurch, Cadmore End and Ibstone served by a Team Rector in Stokenchurch and a Team Vicar in Lane End.  It is one of twenty-seven churches in the Deanery of Wycombe within the Diocese of Oxford (see www.wycombedeanery.com) which in turn is part of the Church of England in the Province of Canterbury in the United Kingdom - our Mother Church is Christ Church Cathedral in Oxford.

A Gospel mission hall dating from 1888 at Moor End now meets as the Elim Christian Centre in the centre of the village near the large estate area.

Amenities
The village school formerly known as Francis Edmonds and now known as Lane End Primary School, takes local children from the age of two until secondary school age.

Lane End Youth and Community Centre is central to the village and is used for a variety of exercise classes, holiday play schemes, lunches for the local elderly residents, coffee mornings, computer classes, band practice and dog obedience classes.  The centre is also used by the local and wider community for private functions.

The village hall is used for dances, jumble sales, bridge club, bingo, The Lane End Players and home to the parish council.

The village now has just one pub the Grouse and Ale (previously known as the Clayton Arms). The Osborne Arms is now an Indian Restaurant. The Old Sun pub closed in 2010 and has been converted into a private residence with two additional properties built on the former garden area and space freed up by demolition. The Jolly Blacksmith at Ditchfield still has its Pub Sign but closed many years ago. The Chairmakers Arms closed around 2000 and is now two private houses situated in the Row. One of the Houses has kept the name and is called Chairmakers.

The village has two ponds, one on the High Street, the other located approximately 80m away on The Row.

Shops on or near the High Street include a butcher, a chemist, a newsagent and a hairdresser.

Lane End is a starting spot for ramblers who journey down the Hambleden valley to look out for the red kite, the windmill at Turville or just to admire the countryside.

Lane End also has a very active conservation group, Lane End Conservation Group, members of which contribute to the parish by carrying out valuable work to improve the environment for locals and visitors.

Lane End has been twinned with St Pierre d'Oleron on the West coast of France since 1999 - the Lane End Twinning Association promotes the links between the two communities and celebrates its twentieth anniversary in 2019.

Industry
Lane End has been long home to two small industrial estates, where several companies are based. Most notable of these companies is the global operation for ELGA LabWater, part of the enormous worldwide Veolia Environment group.
It is also home to the popular food chain, Phil’s Dirty Burger where ex-television personality Randy Bobandy works and resides.

Transport links
Lane End is connected by infrequent bus routes to the neighbouring town of High Wycombe, and several small nearby villages. Red Eagle Buses operate routes 28/28A/28C to High Wycombe and Stokenchurch, while Arriva Shires & Essex operate Route 48 to High Wycombe.

Media 
In the fantasy police procedural novel "The Hanging Tree" by Ben Aaronovitch, the first confrontation between the Met police wizards and the main villain (the Faceless Man) is described as occurring just outside Lane End

Notable residents 

Thomas Stapleton, an English paediatrician, retired to The Foundry Cottage in the village, upon his return to England after working in Australia since 1960; he died there in 2007. He is commemorated by a memorial bench there, with a plaque noting that he "Helped improve the health of children around the world", in English and Chinese.

References

External links
Lane End Parish Council website
Lane End Village
Lane End Players
Lane End Conservation Group (LECG)
Lane End Elim Christian Centre
Lane End Conference Centre
Lane End Twinning Association
Lane End Holy Trinity Church

Villages in Buckinghamshire
Civil parishes in Buckinghamshire